Drop serve may refer to;

 A type of serve in the sport of pickleball
 A type of serve in the sport of roundnet